"Demons in You" is the second single by Finnish rock singer Tarja taken from her fourth studio album The Shadow Self. The digital version of the single was released on 8 October 2016, the physical version was released on 14 November 2016.

Background
The song "Demons in You" was written and composed by Tarja, Julian Barrett, Erik Nyholm, Alex Jonson, and Christel Sundberg, and produced by Tarja. The aggressive sound of the song comes from the need for Tarja to insert an extremely energetic track in her album. The text of the song tells of the demons and the darkness that lie within people. The album version features Alissa White-Gluz, the Arch Enemy frontwoman who sings in both growling and clean voice, and Chad Smith, the Red Hot Chili Peppers drummer. The single also contains two additional versions of the song, one sung by only Tarja and the other featuring Alissa White-Gluz on lead vocal parts.

Track listing

Personnel
Band
Tarja Turunen – keyboards, lead vocals, backing vocals
Alissa White-Gluz – lead vocals (track 3), backing vocals (track 1)
Kevin Chown – bass 
Chad Smith – drums 
Julian Barrett – electric guitar

Production
Alexander Mertsch – artwork
Marcelo Cabuli – executive producer
Justin Shturtz – mastering 
Tim Palmer – mixing 
Tim Tronckoe – photography

References

External links

Tarja Turunen songs
2016 songs
2016 singles
Songs written by Tarja Turunen